Strzyże may refer to the following places:
Strzyże, Pułtusk County in Masovian Voivodeship (east-central Poland)
Strzyże, Żyrardów County in Masovian Voivodeship (east-central Poland)
Strzyże, Warmian-Masurian Voivodeship (north Poland)